CKZZ-FM (Z95.3) is a Canadian radio station in Vancouver, British Columbia. It broadcasts at 95.3 FM with an effective radiated power of 71,300 watts from a transmitter on Mount Seymour, and its studios are located in Richmond. The station has had a hot adult contemporary format since 2004, and is owned by Stingray Group.

History
On February 19, 1990, the CRTC initiated a call for applications for a new commercial FM radio station in Vancouver on the frequency 94.5 MHz. Six companies submitted proposals to the commission for approval. On June 20, 1990, the CRTC approved South Fraser Broadcasting's application for the frequency. On November 1, 1990, the CRTC approved South Fraser's application to amend the frequency to 95.3 MHz due to potential interference with CJJR-FM.

CKZZ, known on-air with the moniker Z95.3, signed on air at 8:00 a.m. on May 23, 1991, and ran commercial-free until May 27. The first song played was "Here We Go (Let's Rock & Roll)" by C&C Music Factory. Founded by South Fraser and controlled by Michael Dickinson, it shares studio and office space with sister station CISL. The station's format was authorized by the CRTC as dance music, and quickly gained popularity among younger audiences in the market. CKZZ was a top-rated station, constantly remaining in the Top 3 most listened-to stations in the market.

In 1995, CKZZ and CISL were sold to Standard Radio. The $18 million CAD purchase was approved by the CRTC on May 8, 1996. Following this sale, CKZZ began to move from the dance format it was licensed for to a CHR/Top 40 format.

The station's success continued into 2001, and ranked number two overall among radio stations in the Vancouver market in the Bureau of Broadcast Measurement ratings for much of the year. Its website also ranked 28th on the list of the "50 Best Radio Station Websites in the World", compiled by U.S. trade publication "Radio Ink". In addition, CKZZ was named "Station of the Year" by Canadian Music Week in March 2002.

In August 2002, the station changed formats again, edging away from its "contemporary hits" format and used the slogan "The Best of the Nineties and Today", but technically remained a CHR.

In February 2004, the station started playing an uninterrupted stream of hit music from its 13-year history, in preparation for another format change. The station switched to their current hot adult contemporary format in March, with the slogan "Your Music, Your Zed, with the Best of the 80s, 90s and Now". Ironically, the station was named "CHR Station of the Year" by Canadian Music Week a few days before its format switch. The first song of the current hot AC format was Coldplay's "Clocks".

Another direction tweak came in September 2005, with the station dropping most of its eighties and nineties tracks and moving towards an adult top 40 format. The slogan, "Today's Best Music", was first used on sister station CJFM/Montreal, and both CKZZ and CJFM had identical playlists.

In the spring of 2007, the Bureau of Broadcast Measurement, released its yearly reports indicating that CKZZ had a 3.6% share of the Vancouver radio market and finishing as the 12th most listened to radio station. This was most likely caused by the launch of Rhythmic Top 40 (now Mainstream Top 40) station CFBT-FM in 2002 and took away the majority of the station's younger audiences, which prompted CKZZ to seek an older audience that listened to the station in its 90's heyday. Such a drop in ratings over the years prompted the end of "Z" and the creation of a new radio station.

Crave (2007-2009)

Just before Midnight on June 3, 2007, "Z" played its last song, "Walk Away" by Kelly Clarkson. CKZZ then began stunting by playing a mix of comedy/novelty songs, TV show and movie bits, etc. At 7:00 a.m. on June 5, the station was renamed 95 Crave, and relaunched with a more rhythmic contemporary format, but retaining the same adult top 40 sound as "Z". The first song was "Music" by Madonna.

In October 2007, Astral Media acquired Standard Broadcasting's terrestrial radio and television assets, including CKZZ.

Virgin Radio (2009-2014)
On January 8, 2009, at 4:00 p.m., CKZZ rebranded as 95.3 Virgin Radio, joining sister station CKFM-FM Toronto. This move had been announced December 4, 2008. Crave's final song was "Beautiful Goodbye" by Amanda Marshall, while Virgin's first song was a remix of "Sway" by Michael Bublé. Following the branding switch to "Virgin", the station eliminated songs from the 1980s; the last station in the "Virgin" chain to do so was CJFM-FM Montreal.

CKZZ competed with CFBT-FM, CFUN-FM, CKPK-FM, CKLG-FM and CHQM-FM.

Sale and the return of Z95.3

In March 2013, the Competition Bureau approved a proposal by Bell Media to acquire Astral Media, under the condition that it divest itself of several television services and radio stations. Following the closure of the merger in July 2013, CKZZ was placed in a blind trust pending its eventual sale.

On August 26, 2013, Newcap Radio announced it would acquire CKZZ along with four other former Astral Media radio stations for $112 million. The deal was approved by the CRTC on March 19, 2014 and the sale closed on March 31, 2014.

As Bell acquired Astral Media's exclusive rights to the Virgin Radio brand in Canada through the purchase, CKZZ revived its heritage Z95.3 branding on March 31, 2014; CKZZ's long-time morning hosts Natalie Hunter and Drew Savage moved to Bell-owned CHQM-FM on April 21. The Virgin Radio brand would re-surface on Bell-owned CFBT-FM on March 5, 2015.

In March 2020, former CKKS-FM morning host Kid Carson—who began his career at CKZZ–and actor Jordan McCloskey became the new hosts of CKZZ's morning show. On February 9, 2022, Carson attracted attention for an on-air rant in support of the "Freedom Convoy" protest, which included discussion of theories that the protests were about "trying to keep our children off a digital ID that will control every aspect of their lives", and expressing frustration that he had been pressured by the station's management to stray away from political commentary on-air after having  discussed his opposition to COVID-19 vaccine passports. Later that day, Stingray Radio's Vancouver GM Devon Tschritter stated that they had "reached a mutual decision to part ways", explaining that "his opinions on vaccines, vaccine mandates, and other issues are his own and we respect that he has a right to his opinions. But he does not have a right to broadcast misleading or inaccurate opinions and label them as facts".

References

External links
Z95.3
 

Kzz
Kzz
Richmond, British Columbia
Kzz
Radio stations established in 1991
1991 establishments in British Columbia